Parabuthus, commonly known as the thick-tailed scorpion, is a genus of large and highly venomous Afrotropical scorpions, that show a preference for areas of low rainfall. Their stings are medically important and human fatalities have been recorded.

Characteristics
They have thick and strong tails, with typically a rough surface to the first (proximal) and sometimes second segment, that is used to produce a warning sound when rubbed against the sting (save P. distridor). Their thick tails are also employed in excavating their shallow burrows, as several are adapted to sandy environments. Some flatter-bodied species, however, take refuge in rock crevasses.

Due to their stings' quick-acting venom, they rely to lesser extent on their slender pinchers (chelae) to hold onto prey. Three species, P. schlechteri, P. transvaalicus, and P. villosus are thought to be able to spray venom from their tails. These three are also the largest buthids in the world, reaching lengths  up to 140 mm and masses up to 14 g.

Other consistent features include a dorsal head covering (carapace) that lacks granular ridges (carinae), while the tail's upper coverings (tergites) have only one inconspicuous middle (median) ridge. The pectine teeth nearest the body in females are enlarged and dilated (P. granulatus and P. kalaharicus excepting), and the lower tarsi (third distal segment) of the front four legs are equipped with bristle combs. The ventrosubmedian ridges in the fourth tail segment disappear away from the body, and the ventrolateral ridges of the fifth segment include distinctly spined or lobed processes near their distal ends.

Diversity
Most of the species, some 20 of the total of 28, are endemic to southern Africa, but they range through eastern Africa to the Arabian Peninsula.

Selected species
 Parabuthus brevimanus
 Parabuthus capensis
 Parabuthus granulatus
 Parabuthus laevipes
 Parabuthus liosoma
 Parabuthus mossambicensis
 Parabuthus namibensis
 Parabuthus raudus
 Parabuthus schlechteri
 Parabuthus stridulus
 Parabuthus transvaalicus
 Parabuthus villosus

Phylogenetics
Its nearest relations are the Afrotropical buthid genera Grosphus and Uroplectes, which lack the distinct stridulatory surfaces. The following cladogram illustrates relationships among 20 Parabuthus and these outlying genera, according to an analysis done by Lorenzo Prendini et al. 2003. Some recently described species (P. cimrmani, P. eritreaensis, P. truculentus and P. zavattarii) were not considered in the investigation, so that their positions within this system remain unresolved.

Notes

References

 
Scorpion genera
Arachnids of Africa